Schleicher County is a county located on the Edwards Plateau in the U.S. state of Texas. As of the 2020 census, its population was 2,451. Its county seat is Eldorado. The county was created in 1887 and organized in 1901. It is named for Gustav Schleicher, a German immigrant who became a surveyor and politician.

History
Around  8000 BC, the first inhabitants in the area were probably Jumano Indians. Later inhabitants were Lipan Apaches  and Comanches. In 1632, Fray Juan de Salas and Father Juan de Ortega did missionary work among the Jumanos. Soldier Francisco Amangual led an expedition across the area in 1808. In 1882, Christopher Columbus Doty became the first permanent citizen of Schleicher County.

The Texas Legislature established Schleicher County in April 1887   from Crockett County, and named it in honor of Gustav Schleicher. By 1890, the population was 155, of whom 134 were listed as White, four  were Black, and 17 were American Indian.

In 1894, the county's first public school opened at Verand, and later moved to Eldorado. The next year, W. B. Silliman founded the Eldorado community and named it after the mythical city. To populate it, he offered free town lots to residents of nearby Verand.
In 1930, the Panhandle and Santa Fe Railway Company resumed work on a previous railroad, making access possible to San Angelo and Sonora. On February 27, 1941, the West Texas Woolen Mills plant in Eldorado held a grand opening, with a parade and BBQ lunch. About 5,000 people attended. Governor "Pappy" W. Lee O'Daniel was the guest speaker.

Oilfield discoveries on school lands in the 1950s enabled Schleicher County to build new library and gymnasium facilities for its students.

Geography

Major Highways
  U.S. Highway 190
  U.S. Highway 277

Adjacent counties
 Tom Green County (north)
 Menard County (east)
 Sutton County (south)
 Crockett County (west)
 Irion County (northwest)
 Kimble County (southeast)

Demographics

Note: the US Census treats Hispanic/Latino as an ethnic category. This table excludes Latinos from the racial categories and assigns them to a separate category. Hispanics/Latinos can be of any race.

As of the census of 2000,  2,935 people, 1,115 households, and 817 families resided in the county.  The population density was about two people per square mile (1/km2).  The 1,371 housing units averaged about one per square mile (<1/km2).  The racial makeup of the county was 76.59% White, 1.53% African American, 0.07% Native American, 0.17% Asian, 0.03% Pacific Islander, 18.98% from other races, and 2.62% from two or more races.  About 43.54% of the population was Hispanic or Latino of any race.

Of the 1,115 households, 34.30% had children under the age of 18 living with them, 62.60% were married couples living together, 7.50% had a female householder with no husband present, and 26.70% were not families; 25.40% of all households were made up of individuals, and 12.80% had someone living alone who was 65 years of age or older.  The average household size was 2.59 and the average family size was 3.12.

In the county, the population was distributed as 27.90% under the age of 18, 7.30% from 18 to 24, 24.00% from 25 to 44, 24.40% from 45 to 64, and 16.40% who were 65 years of age or older.  The median age was 39 years. For every 100 females, there were 98.80 males.  For every 100 females age 18 and over, there were 94.90 males.

Males had a median income of $28,412 versus $22,250 for females. The per capita income for the county was $15,969. About 16.00% of families and 21.50% of the population were below the poverty line, including 29.00% of those under age 18 and 19.90% of those age 65 or over.

Between 2010 and 2020, the population of Schleicher County decreased to 2,451.  The percentage decline in the population of 29.2 percent was the second largest among the 3,138 U.S. counties.

Communities

Cities
 Eldorado (county seat)

Unincorporated communities
 Adams
 Hulldale

Politics

See also

 List of museums in Central Texas
 National Register of Historic Places listings in Schleicher County, Texas
 Recorded Texas Historic Landmarks in Schleicher County

References

External links
 Schleicher County government's website
 
 Inventory of county records, Schleicher County Courthouse, Eldorado, Texas, hosted by the Portal to Texas History
 Schleicher County Profile from the Texas Association of Counties

 
1901 establishments in Texas
Populated places established in 1901
Texas Hill Country
Majority-minority counties in Texas